The New South Wales stainless steel carriage stock was a type of passenger carriage operated by the New South Wales Government Railways from 1961 until 1993.

These carriages were mainly used on interstate trains such as the Southern Aurora, which ran between Sydney and Melbourne, its slower counterpart the Spirit of Progress and the Brisbane Limited. They were also used on the Gold Coast Motorail to Murwillumbah. 

With the demise of locomotive-hauled trains, the majority of the carriages passed to the Australian Railway Historical Society, Canberra and New South Wales Rail Transport Museum (now the NSW Rail Museum) who have maintained them in operational condition. The latter infrequently operates them on tours under the Southern Aurora banner. Since November 2020, Vintage Rail Journeys has emerged as the primary operator of ex-Southern Aurora/Brisbane Limited carriages, using a combination of their carriages and carriages hired in from THNSW/LVR.

Design
The carriages used featured fluted sides and consisted of roomette and twinette sleepers, lounge cars and diners, with the Southern Aurora carriages being owned when new jointly by the New South Wales Government Railways and Victorian Railways, and both the Brisbane Express and Gold Coast Motorail carriages being owned by the New South Wales Government Railways.

Construction

Brisbane Express Cars
In late 1954, tenders were called for by the Department of Railways for 24 air conditioned carbon steel bodied cars for the Brisbane Limited similar in construction the HUB and RUB sets. The trains would have been marshalled into two 9-carriage sets, plus one of each type spare. The contract was awarded to Commonwealth Engineering, Granville in August 1955. Commonwealth Engineering had put an option in their tender application for these cars to be constructed from stainless steel instead of the carbon steel specified and they were successful with this option. However, reduced available funds led to extended delays and the renegotiation of the contract and with the contract being changed and by 1959 the cars actually ordered had changed to only 5 LAN roomette sleepers (2323-2327) and 5 NAM twinette sleepers (2328-2332). These cars were built from stainless steel and used design techniques that Commonwealth Engineering had licensed from the Budd Company.

Southern Aurora & Spirit of Progress Joint Stock Cars
A fleet of 34 stainless steel carriages were jointly purchased by the Department of Railways New South Wales and Victorian Railways for the commencement of the Southern Aurora between Sydney and Melbourne in April 1962. The carriages were ordered from Commonwealth Engineering, Granville and the cars as ordered for this service consisted of:
9 NAM twinette sleeping cars with a capacity of 20 passengers numbered 2335-2343
2 DAM deluxe twinette sleeping cars with a capacity of 18 passengers numbered 2333 & 2334, with 2333 being owned by Victorian Railways and 2334 by NSWGR.
3 RMS dining cars numbered 2358-2360
3 BCS lounge cars numbered 2355-2357
11 LAN roomette sleeping cars with a capacity of 20 passengers numbered 2344-2354
3 PHN power/ brake vans numbered 2361-2363
3 MHN luggage brake vans numbered 2364-2366

Additional cars to the same design were also ordered for use on the Spirit of Progress, these cars consisted of:
3 NAM twinette sleeping cars with a capacity of 20 passengers numbered 2367, 2368 & 2373
3 PHN power/ brake vans numbered 2369-2371

Seven were destroyed in the Violet Town rail accident on 7 February 1969 with replacement stock built in 1970/71. The replacement cars of the same design were given new numbers, but used bogies recovered from the crash site.
2 NAM, numbered 2374-2375
3 LAN, numbered 2376-2378
1 BCS, numbered 2379
1 PHN, numbered 2381

Gold Coast Motorail Cars
To provide additional sleeping cars for the Brisbane Limited and Gold Coast Motorail, ten twinette sleeping cars with a capacity of 18 sleeping passengers in nine compartments were ordered by the Public Transport Commission. These cars were coded FAM (2382-2391) and were delivered by Commonwealth Engineering in 1975/76. These had deeper skirts than the earlier built carriages.

Power Vans

Five power vans with a guard's compartment were delivered during late 1984; they were coded PHA & numbered 2392-2396. These cars were built by A Goninan & Co and differed slightly in exterior finish as Goninans constructed them using design techniques that they had licensed from the Pullman Company as opposed to the Budd techniques used by Commonwealth Engineering. The PHA vans were meant to be replacements for the PHS vans on the longer distance locomotive hauled trains and were fitted with three GM 8V71 125 kW diesel alternator units. These were later replaced by three Cummins engines in PHA 2393 and 2396.

Operations

Southern Aurora era 1962-1986

Violet Town crash, 1969
Seven were destroyed in the Violet Town rail accident on 7 February 1969 with replacement stock built in 1970/71. The replacement cars of the same design were given new numbers.

Sydney & Melbourne Express era 1986-1993

Withdrawal
Some of these cars were withdrawn following the cessation of the North Coast sleepers in February 1990 and the balance when the Sydney/Melbourne Express ceased in November 1993.

Heritage operations era 1993-Current
Some were placed on RailCorp's heritage register and placed in the custody of the New South Wales Rail Transport Museum. with most other auctioned in August 1994. Queensland Rail purchased six and moved them to Townsville with the aim of refurbishing for use on The Inlander, but the project was cancelled. Canberra Railway Museum had fifteen cars.

Repurposing

NAM 2332 & NAM 2342 were retained for use as crew carriages with breakdown cranes. NAM 2332 had 4 compartments and the conductors compartment reconfigured as a dining area and kitchen. It is now used by THNSW as a crew carriage. NAM 2342 had the interior of its compartments painted gloss beige whilst in service as a crew car.

Three were converted to track recording cars (known as AK Cars) and have been used across Australia's standard gauge network to record track geometry.

V/Line Passenger acquisition of NAM2337

NAM 2337 was purchased by V/Line in 2016 from a private buyer, and the preparations were made to convert it to a power van to be used on the North East Line. In July 2018, the V/Line Board kindly agreed to donate the carriage to the Southern Aurora commemoration project located at Violet Town.

Vintage Rail Journeys era 2017-Current

In August 2017, NSWGR Holdings Pty Ltd purchased 7 carriages at auction from the liquidator of the former ARHS (ACT). Further purchases have since been made, such that the organisation now owns a total of 17 ex-Southern Aurora Carriages. From November 2017, the initial 7 carriages were moved to Lithgow Railway Workshops, where NAMs 2330, 2341, 2342 & 2374 were restored. LANs 2348, 2372, MHN 2366 & NAM 2335 were subsequently moved to Goulburn Locomotive Roundhouse where restoration commenced in September 2019, concluding in March 2020. RMS 2360 was restored in Goulburn and Thirlmere commencing January 2021, with PHN 2381 following in January 2022. These carriages were housed at the NSW Rail Museum, Thirlmere under a commercial arrangement. NAM 2367 and LANs 2325 & 2344 have since been moved to Goulburn Locomotive Roundhouse pending restoration. NAM 2367 is the subject of a Regional Job Creation Grant and restoration has commenced in November 2021, with completion due by September 2022. In conjunction with the THNSW Fleet, Vintage Rail Journeys (a subsidiary of NSWGR Holdings Pty Ltd) promoted 5 day/4 night rail tours operated by Lachlan Valley Railway. Nine tours in 2020/2021/2022 had to be cancelled due to the COVID-19 pandemic. Vintage Rail Journeys have since conducted four Golden West Rail Tours (November 2020, April 2021, February 2022, March 2022), four Riverina Rail Tours (March 2021, February 2022, March 2022) and a North Coast Rail Tour (June 2021). In June 2022, the arrangement with THNSW concluded, and on 1 July 2022 the fleet comprising NAM 2330, NAM 2335, NAM 2341, NAM 2342, LAN 2348, RMS 2360, MHN 2366, NAM 2374 & PHN 2381 were re-located to Goulburn Rail Heritage Centre.

Fleet Details
Most of the Southern Aurora cars entered service in February, March or April 1962, and except for those destroyed at Violet Town in 1969, they lasted until 1991. They were then stored until August 1994, at which point the final XPT deliveries rendered the Aurora fleet obsolete and they were dispersed among various collections.

Cars were allocated to either the New South Wales Railways or the Victorian Railways for maintenance purposes, and fitted with either 2BS or 2BU bogies respectively. The 2BU bogies were each half a ton heavier than their 2BS counterparts. NSW carriages were maintained at ACDEP while Victorian Railways carriages were transferred to South Dynon, then shifted across to temporary broad gauge bogies and run to Newport Workshops for maintenance, then returned by the same procedure. All PHN and MHN vans were allocated to New South Wales, and were fitted with 2CA bogies which had higher capacity due to 6R axle boxes/130mm axle journals and different secondary spring sets.

Dining cars (RMS)
Three RMS dining cars were built for the Southern Aurora service. Numbered 2358 through 2360 and entering service in 1962, they used more or less the standard dining car interior with a kitchen at one end and two rows of six four-seater tables either side of a central aisle, for 48 diners at any time. The standard Aurora consist carried up to 200 passengers, so they could nearly all be served across four sittings; additional food facilities were provided in the BCS lounge car for the balance.

The kitchen area was about 28 ft long, plus a small staff compartment and staff bathroom at the non-dining end of the carriage. External doors were only provided for kitchen access; passengers were expected to access the carriage from other cars, rather than directly. The New South Wales car weighed 43 tons, while the Victorian cars rated 44 tons because of the different bogie designs.

Lounge cars (BCS)
Three BCS lounge cars were initially provided for the Southern Aurora service. BCS2355 and 2357 were allocated to New South Wales and operated on 2BU bogies, while BCS2356 was allocated to Victoria with 2BU bogies.

The cars had three saloon areas, provided with 27 movable chairs, 5 movable tables and 15 smokers' stands as well as some fixed lounge benches, for a total capacity of 40 passengers. A small kitchen area was also provided, but no bathroom facilities. When fitted with 2BU bogies the cars were rated at 40 tons, or with 2BS bogies 39 tons.
Roomette cars (LAN)
Twenty LAN cars were built from 1959 to 1971. Cars 2323-2327 were the first built, and they were followed by 2344-2354, 2372 and 2376-2378.

The first five were constructed for the Brisbane Limited Express from 1959, and the design was mostly repeated with the eleven Southern Aurora cars from 1961. The only difference was the arrangement of access to the bathroom and the location of the doorway for accessing the Conductor's compartment. The modified design was also applied to 2372, built as extra capacity for the Brisbane Limited, and 2376-2378 built to replace cars 2345, 2346 and 2350 destroyed in the 1969 Violet Town crash.

These cars used a central curved hallway with compartments either side, providing a total of 20 single-person berths. In daylight hours the beds would be folded away and replaced with a single lounge chair and small table.

Twinette cars (NAM & FAM)
A total of 19 NAM twinette sleeping cars were constructed across five batches from 1959 to 1971, numbered 2328-2332, 2335-2343, 2367-2368, 2373 and finally 2374-2375.

The first five were constructed for the Brisbane Limited Express from 1959, and the design was repeated with 9 cars built for the Southern Aurora, three built for the Spirit of Progress, and two built as replacements for cars 2339 and 2343 destroyed in the Violet Town crash of 1969.

Each car had a side hallway, serving an attendant's compartment at pone end plus ten individual compartments. Each of these could seat three passengers in day mode, but were only fitted with two berths (in a bunk arrangement) for night travel. The berths were set up while passengers were in the dining room for dinner, and restored to seating format following breakfast each day. The name "twinette" indicates two people per sleeping compartment.

The ten FAM cars built for the Brisbane Limited and Gold Coast Motorail were based on a more modern design, as applied for the Indian Pacific fleet from 1970. Compartments were a little larger each, and as such the cars only had capacity for 18 passengers in 9 compartments (or 27 sitting).

Deluxe Twinette cars (DAM)
One deluxe twinnette sleeping carriage was built for each system - Victoria had DAM2333 on 2BU bogies at 42 tons, and New South Wales had DAM2334 on 2BS bogies for 43 tons.

The cars were almost identical to the NAM sleepers, with compartments attached to a side corridor and a small conductor's cabin at one end. The main difference was that the DAM cars' centre two compartments were merged, with the internal wall removed and the whole space allocated to only two sleeping passengers, rather than four. This luxury compartment provided a wider bed at one end, with two armchairs and a full WC and shower, and was placed in the centre of the carriage for maximum comfort.

The cars entered service in February and March 1962, and were both in use until 1991, then stored to August of 1994.

Power vans (PHN & PHA)
Three PHN power vans were initially built for the Southern Aurora, to provide head end power for air conditioning and on-train lighting as well as an additional 6 tons of luggage capacity. The vehicles were PHN2361, 2632 and 2363. A further three vehicles were built in 1962 for the Spirit of Progress when that was transferred across to standard gauge, and numbered 2369, 2370 and 2371. The six entered service respectively in December 1961, then February and March of 1962, with all three of the Spirit vans entering service in April 1962.

The vans were fitted with three engine mounting points, and weighed 48 tons with two fitted or 51 tons with all three.

In 1984 five further vans were built for the Gold Coast Motorail service to a similar design, but with deeper skirts and other minor finish differences, this was due to these vans being built by A Goninan & Co instead of Commonwealth Engineering who built all the other stainless steel cars. These vans became PHA 2392 to 2396.

Luggage vans (MHN)
Three MHN vans were built for the Southern Aurora, to provide 24 tons of luggage capacity for the train as well as a guard compartment. The three were identified as MHN 2364 to 2366, and were jointly owned by the Victorian and New South Wales railways but allocated to NSW for maintenance purposes, and fitted with 2CA bogies. Each van weighed 34 tons, with a central 6'6" guards compartment and two 34'3" luggage compartments, one either side.

Individual carriage details
Columns "Code" through "Withdrawn" are derived from Banger (2012) pp. 180–186, except where marked as another source.

()

Model railways

HO Scale

Lima
Lima produced approximations of these carriages.

Trainbuilder
In 2010 Trainbuilder offered complete Southern Aurora consists, built with brass, fully detailed externally (and internally, for the BCS and RMS cars) and fitted with internal lighting. The options were for a 10-car set with 3x LAN, 2x NAM and one of each of the other classes for $5,500 or a 7-car set with one of everything for $3,850. Additional LAN and NAM cars were available for purchase at $550 each, only to customers who had ordered sets. It is known that one loose LAN was LAN2351, and one loose NAM was NAM2368.

The cars included marker lights and the end light box on the MHN, and windows of the sleeping cars were tinted and fitted with blinds.

Auscision
In 2016 Auscision released a series of Stainless Steel carriages in ready-to-run plastic. A set of ten cost $1,400 (or $1,500 with end lighting boards), four-packs of cars cost $560, and individual cars sold for $140.

The range included:
 Southern Aurora 10 Car Set, 1973-1986 Era - NAM-2337, NAM-2342, DAM-2333, LAN-2344, LAN-2347, LAN-2352, RMS-2359, BCS-2357, PHN-2381, MHN-2366. The end cars have illuminated Southern Aurora signs, and the BCS has Southern Aurora name plates. 
 Melbourne/Sydney Express 10 Car Set, 1986-1993 Era - NAM-2338, NAM-2342, NAM-2336, DAM-2333, LAN-2347, LAN-2351, RMS-2360, BCS-2379, PHN-2381, MHN2366. The BCS has a Sydney Express plate on one side, and a Melbourne ExPress (sic) plate on the other side. Replacement plates with correct Melbourne Express are available from Auscision directly.
 Southern Aurora® 4 Car Add-on Set, 1962-1986 Era - NAM-2340, NAM-2336, LAN-2353, LAN-2349
 Brisbane Limited 4 Car Add-on Set, 1961-1990 Era - NAM-2329, NAM-2330, LAN-2326, LAN-2323
 Spirit of Progress Pack 2 Car Add-on Set, 1962-1986 Era - NAM-2341, PHN-2371
 XPT Demo Train, Mail Van Single Car - MHN-2364
 West Coast Rail RMS Dining Car - RMS-2360

Dining and lounge cars were fitted with full interiors, and the sleeping cars had venetian blinds and tinted windows simulated.

Individual 2BU and 2CA bogies were also made available.

On 28 September 2020 a surprise release of the FAM sleeping carriages
The range included:
 NSWGR L7 1975 - 1994 Era - FAM-2382, FAM-2384, FAM-2386
 NSWGR 1983 - 1994 Era - FAM-2383, FAM-2385, FAM-2388, FAM-2391

N Scale 

In 2008/09Peter Boormans Workshop released a range of polyurethane body kits covering all Southern Aurora car types. The kits include appropriate decals. Bogies are to be provided by the kit builder.

See also
Southern Aurora
Intercapital Daylight
Spirit of Progress
Sydney/Melbourne Express
Brisbane Limited

References

Further reading
The Southern Aurora Sleeping Cars - Design and Construction Adam, Eric Australian Railway Historical Society Bulletin, October, November 1990 pp231–243,255-

Interstate rail in Australia
Named passenger trains of Australia
Night trains of Australia
Passenger rail transport in New South Wales
Passenger rail transport in Victoria (Australia)
Railway services introduced in 1962
Railway services discontinued in 1986
1962 establishments in Australia
1986 disestablishments in Australia
Railway coaches of New South Wales